Emiliano Álvarez Arana (25 October 1912 — 1 June 1987) was a Spanish cyclist. He was professional from 1932 to 1939. He was born in Errenteria.

Major results

1932
1st stage 5 Volta a la Comunitat Valenciana
1933
2nd Volta a la Comunitat Valenciana
1st stage 5
1934
1st Bordeaux-Angoulême
1st Prueba Villafranca de Ordizia
1st Barcelona-Jaca
1st Vuelta a Irun
19353rd Bordeaux-Angoulême
1st Vuelta al Valle de Léniz
1936
1st stage 21 Vuelta a España
1st Grand Prix de la Bicicleta Eibarresa
1938
3rd Tour de Corrèze
1939
1st Circuit des cols Pyrenean
1st stage 2

References

External links

1912 births
1987 deaths
Spanish male cyclists
Spanish Vuelta a España stage winners
Spanish emigrants to Chile
People from Errenteria
Sportspeople from Gipuzkoa
Cyclists from the Basque Country (autonomous community)